Plaxomicrus pallidicolor is a species of beetle in the family Cerambycidae. It was described by Pic in 1912. It is known from China and Vietnam.

References

Astathini
Beetles described in 1912